In the Whyte notation for the classification of steam locomotive wheel arrangement, a 0-4-4-0 is a locomotive with no leading truck, two sets of four driving wheels, and no trailing truck. Examples of this type were constructed as Shay, Heisler, Climax, Mallet, Meyer, BMAG and Double Fairlie locomotives. A similar configuration was used on some Garratts, but it is referred to as 0-4-0+0-4-0.

Equivalent classifications
Other equivalent classifications are:
UIC classification: BB (also known as German classification and Italian classification)
French classification: 020+020
Turkish classification: 22+22
Swiss classification: 2/2+2/2

The UIC classification is refined to B'B for a Mallet locomotive or B'B' for a Meyer locomotive.

Fairlie examples

The first Fairlie 0-4-4-0 was built for the Neath and Brecon Railway in 1866, but the design came to prominence in 1869 with Little Wonder for the Festiniog Railway in North Wales followed by five others. One locomotive was supplied to the Denver and Rio Grande Railroad in 1872. The type was also used in  Mexico, New Zealand and Russia on Transcaucasian Railway.

Survivors
There are three examples of surviving Fairlie 0-4-4-0 locomotives on the Ffestiniog Railway the last of which was built in 1992.
"Josephine", a Vulcan Foundry-built Double Fairlie (built in 1872 for the Dunedin and Port Chalmers Railway Company) survives as a static exhibit in Dunedin, New Zealand.

Eritrean Railways
Eritrean Railways used many 0-4-4-0Ts. The last was built in their own shops in 1963, making it the last Mallet built in the world.

External links
More information on Eritrean Railways' 0-4-4-0Ts.

 
44,0-4-4-0